The Pomodoro Technique is a time management method developed by Francesco Cirillo in the late 1980s. It uses a kitchen timer to break work into intervals, typically 25 minutes in length, separated by short breaks. Each interval is known as a pomodoro, from the Italian word for tomato, after the tomato-shaped kitchen timer Cirillo used as a university student. 

The technique has been widely popularized by apps and websites providing timers and instructions. Closely related to concepts such as timeboxing and iterative and incremental development used in software design, the method has been adopted in pair programming contexts.

Description 
The original technique has six steps:
 Decide on the task to be done.
 Set the pomodoro timer (typically for 25 minutes). 
 Work on the task.
 End work when the timer rings and take a short break (typically 5–10 minutes).
 If you have finished fewer than three pomodoros, go back to Step 2 and repeat until you go through all three pomodoros.
 After three pomodoros are done, take the fourth pomodoro and then take a long break (typically 20 to 30 minutes). Once the long break is finished, return to step 2.

For the purposes of the technique, a pomodoro is an interval of work time. 

Regular breaks are taken, aiding assimilation. A 10-minute break separates consecutive pomodoros. Four pomodoros form a set. There is a longer 20–30 minute break between sets.

A goal of the technique is to reduce the effect of internal and external interruptions on focus and flow. A pomodoro is indivisible; when interrupted during a pomodoro, either the other activity must be recorded and postponed (using the inform – negotiate – schedule – call back strategy) or the pomodoro must be abandoned.

After task completion in a pomodoro, any remaining time should be devoted to activities, for example:

 Review your work just completed (optional)
 Review the activities from a learning point of view (ex: What learning objective did you accomplish? What learning outcome did you accomplish? Did you fulfill your learning target, objective, or outcome for the task?)
 Review the list of upcoming tasks for the next planned pomodoro time blocks, and start reflecting on or updating them.

Cirillo suggests: 

The stages of planning, tracking, recording, processing and visualizing are fundamental to the technique.  In the planning phase, tasks are prioritized by recording them in a "To Do Today" list, enabling users to estimate the effort they will require. As pomodoros are completed, they are recorded, adding to a sense of accomplishment and providing raw data for subsequent self-observation and improvement.

Tools
The creator and his proponents encourage a low-tech approach, using a mechanical timer, paper and pencil. The physical act of winding the timer confirms the user's determination to start the task; ticking externalises desire to complete the task; ringing announces a break. Flow and focus become associated with these physical stimuli.

The technique has inspired application software for several platforms, with various programs available.

See also
 52/17 rule
 Incremental reading
 Life hacking
 Procrastination

References

 Personal development
Personal time management
 time management